Compsolechia melanophaea is a moth of the family Gelechiidae. It was described by William Trowbridge Merrifield Forbes in 1931. It is found in Puerto Rico.

References

Moths described in 1931
Compsolechia